Cesáreo Guillermo y Bastardo; (March 8, 1847November 8, 1885) was President of the Dominican Republic in 1878 and in 1879. His parents were Pedro Guillermo and Rosalía Bastardo. He entered the Dominican military at age 16.

External links

|-

|-

1847 births
1885 deaths
People from Hato Mayor Province
Presidents of the Dominican Republic
Children of national leaders